The Pakistan International is a squash tournament that takes place in Islamabad.

Past Results

Men's

References

External links
- Squash site 2004 website

PSA World Tour
Squash tournaments in Pakistan